The 2011 FIBA Under-19 World Championship (Latvian: 2011. gada FIBA pasaules čempionāts līdz 19 gadu vecumam) was the 10th edition of the FIBA U19 World Championship, the biennial international men's youth basketball championship contested by the U19 national teams of the member associations of FIBA. 

It was hosted by Latvia from 30 June to 10 July 2011. The draw for the tournament took place on 17 February 2011 in Riga. Teams played a round robin schedule, with the top three teams advancing to the knockout stage. Lithuania won their first title, and captain Jonas Valančiūnas was chosen the tournament MVP.

Venues
Below is a list of the venues which were used to host games during the 2011 FIBA Under-19 World Championship. All games of a preliminary round group were held in a single arena, as well as the games in the knockout round.

Draw
The draw held on February 17 divided the qualified teams into four groups named A, B, C, and D, as listed for the preliminary round. Aside from the fact that those teams in the same pot would not be in the same preliminary round groups, there were restrictions on how teams may be drawn. Before the draw was aware that Latvia will not be the same group with Lithuania, who will play in Liepāja. In addition to the FIBA wanted the first stage in each city to play over the three European teams, which meant that Russia should play a sample set of Valmiera groups.

Group stage
All times are local (UTC+3).

Group A

Group B

Group C

Group D

Eighth-final round

Group E

Group F

Classification round

13th–16th place

Semifinals

Fifteenth place game

Thirteenth place game

9th–12th place

Semifinals

Eleventh place game

Ninth place game

Final round

Bracket

5th place bracket

Quarterfinals

Classification 5–8

Semifinals

Seventh place game

Fifth place game

Bronze medal game

Final

Final standings

Statistical leaders

Points

Rebounds

Assists

Blocks

Steals

Awards

All-Tournament Team
  Aleksandar Cvetković
  Hugh Greenwood
  Jeremy Lamb
  Dmitry Kulagin
  Jonas Valančiūnas

Referees
FIBA named 26 referees that officiated at the tournament.
  Fernando Jorge Samprieto
  Philip Lawrence Poulton Haines
  Guilherme Locatelli
  Michael John Weiland
  Zhiyuan Jiang
  Yi-Chih Chung
  Jose Hernan Melgarejo Pinto
  Joseph Bissang
  Robert Lottermoser
  Elias Koromilas
  Guerrino Cerebuch
  Takao Udagawa
  Olegs Latisevs
  Arnis Ozols
  Marwan Egho
  Samir Abaakil
  Naftal Candido Chongo
  Fernando Rocha
  Roberto Vazquez
  Sergey Mikhaylov
  Milivoje Jovcic
  Damir Javor
  Vicente Bulto
  Borys Ryzhyk
  Alejandro Sanchez Varela
  John Daniel Goble

References

External links 
 Official website
 2011 FIBA U19 World Championship
   

2011
2011 in basketball
2011–12 in Latvian basketball
2011